Najafabad (also Romanized as Najafābād) is a village in Kakasharaf Rural District, in the Central District of Khorramabad County, Lorestan Province, Iran. At the 2006 census, its population was 144, in 25 families.

References 

Towns and villages in Khorramabad County